Sofrer Para Gozar is a 1923 Brazilian silent drama film directed by Eugenio Centenaro Kerrigan.

The film premiered in Rio de Janeiro on 27 December 1923.

Cast

Cacilda Alencar as Edith Barros 
Juracy Aymoré   
João dos Santos Galvão   
Lincoln Garrido as  Tim 
José Rodrigues   
Waldemar Rodrigues as Jacques Fernandes 
João Rodrigues Serra   
Otto Stange   
Ricardo Zaratini as Jayme Lourenço

External links

1923 drama films
1923 films
Brazilian black-and-white films
Brazilian silent films
Brazilian drama films
Silent drama films